Ledborough was a former hamlet in the parish of Beaconsfield, in Buckinghamshire, England which has become incorporated into the urban area of the town of Beaconsfield as it rapidly expanded in the early part of the 20th century.

Hamlets in Buckinghamshire